Carlos Augusto may refer to:

Carlos Augusto Alves Santana (born 1947), Mexican-American guitarist also known as Santana
Carlos Augusto Ayres de Freitas Britto (born 1942), former chief justice of the Supreme Court of Brazil
Carlos Augusto Bertoldi (born 1985), Brazilian footballer also known as Ticão
Carlos Augusto Bertulani, Brazilian theoretical physicist and professor
Carlos Augusto Campos (born 1978), Brazilian sprint canoer
Carlos Augusto de Oliveira (born 1974), Brazilian film director
Carlos Augusto Filho (born 1986), Brazilian mixed martial artist and kickboxer also known as Guto Inocente
Carlos Augusto Lobatón Espejo (born 1980), Peruvian footballer (midfielder)
Carlos Augusto Ochoa Mendoza (born 1978), Mexican footballer
Carlos Augusto Peres (born 1963), Brazilian field biologist
Carlos Augusto Ribeiro Canário (born 1918), Portuguese deceased footballer
Carlos Augusto Rivera Guerra (born 1986), Mexican singer
Carlos Augusto Soares da Costa Faria Carvalhal (born 1965), Portuguese football manager and retired footballer
Carlos Augusto Vásquez (born 1982), Venezuelan baseball player
Carlos Augusto Zambrano (born 1989), Peruvian footballer (defender)
Carlos Augusto Zopolato Neves (born 1999), Brazilian footballer
Carlos Henrique Barbosa Augusto (born 1989), Brazilian footballer also known as Henrique